Mohammed Al-Dhefiri (born 6 April 1999) is a Saudi Arabian professional footballer who plays as a forward for Al-Qaisumah.

Career
Al-Dhefiri started his career at Al-Batin and was promoted to the first team during the 2018-19 season. He played his first match against Al-Taawoun on 26 October 2018. During the 2019–20 season Al-Dhefiri made 15 appearances and scored twice as Al-Batin were crowned champions of the MS League. On 13 January 2022, Al-Dhafiri joined Ohod on loan. On 9 August 2022, Al-Dhefiri joined First Division side Al-Qaisumah.

Honours
Al-Batin
MS League: 2019–20

References

External links
 

1999 births
Living people
Saudi Arabian footballers
Al Batin FC players
Ohod Club players
Al-Qaisumah FC players
Saudi Professional League players
Saudi First Division League players
Association football forwards